The  is a seaport in Takamatsu, Kagawa Prefecture, Japan. The port serves the islands of the Seto Inland Sea with car ferries and passenger only high-speed ferries. Major routes include those to Shodoshima and Naoshima.

See also
Sunport Takamatsu

External links

Port of Takamatsu 
 Live webcam overseeing parts of the Port of Takamatsu

Takamatsu
Buildings and structures in Kagawa Prefecture
Transport in Kagawa Prefecture